Leonard Carmichael (November 9, 1898 – September 16, 1973) was an American educator and psychologist. In addition, he became the seventh secretary of the Smithsonian Institution in 1953.

Education and academic career
Carmichael, the son of a physician and a teacher, was born in 1898, in Germantown, Pennsylvania. He received his B.S. degree from Tufts University in 1921, and his PhD from Harvard University in 1924. He was a brother in the Theta Delta Chi fraternity during his time at Tufts. He became an instructor at Princeton University's Department of Psychology in 1924 and was appointed to assistant professor in 1926. In 1927 he joined the faculty at Brown University, where he taught for fourteen year and did research on the behavior of primates. In 1937 he moved to the University of Rochester and then, in 1938, he was appointed president of Tufts University, where he remained until his departure for the Smithsonian in 1953.

Secretary of the Smithsonian
Carmichael served as the secretary of the Smithsonian Institution from 1953 to 1964. He was the first Secretary to be hired from outside the Institution, rather than promoted from within.  During Carmichael's tenure, the National Portrait Gallery was created, the Patent Office Building was acquired for the American Art and Portrait Galleries, and the Museum of History and Technology (now the National Museum of American History) was opened. New wings were added to the National Museum of Natural History, the Hope Diamond was donated by Harry Winston, and the Fénykövi elephant was unveiled in the rotunda of the Natural History Museum. The Smithsonian Astrophysical Observatory was revitalized and moved to Cambridge, Massachusetts. In 1957, when Sputnik was launched, the observatory was the only US lab capable of tracking the Soviet satellite. After the death of a visitor at the National Zoological Park, Carmichael sought additional funding for major improvements to meet safety regulations. The Friends of the National Zoo was created and a Master Plan for zoo improvement was formulated and initiated.

Later life and legacy
After leaving the Smithsonian, Carmichael became vice-president for research and exploration of the National Geographic Society.  In 1972 he was awarded the Public Welfare Medal from the National Academy of Sciences. A Tufts University's community service organization, the Leonard Carmichael Society; Carmichael Hall, a dormitory and dining hall on the Tufts campus; and the lunar crater Carmichael were all named in his honor.

Carmichael is sometimes mentioned in connection with the MKULTRA project.

He died on September 16, 1973.

References

This article contains public domain text from the Smithsonian Institution Archives.

Further reading

1898 births
1973 deaths
Brown University faculty
Harvard University alumni
Tufts University alumni
Tufts University faculty
Presidents of Tufts University
Secretaries of the Smithsonian Institution
Presidents of the American Psychological Association
20th-century American psychologists
20th-century American academics